Daniel Bluman (born 15 March 1990) is a Colombian-born Israeli Olympic show jumping rider. In July 2019 Bluman, as part of Israel's four-rider squad, qualified to represent Israel at the 2020 Summer Olympics in Tokyo.

Early and personal life
Bluman was born in Medellín, Colombia. His father, Samuel, is an entrepreneur, and his mother, Orly, is an Israeli psychologist and social worker. He has a brother, Steven.  His Polish-born Jewish grandfather on his father's side, a Holocaust survivor whose entire family was murdered, was in the Auschwitz concentration camp for three years and later emigrated to Colombia. His father's family is from Poland and Holland.  His grandfather on his mother's side is Israeli, and his mother's family is from Israel and Hungary. 

Bluman attended Hebrew school growing up. When he was ten years old, he moved with his family to South Florida in the United States. An alumnus of Cypress Bay High School in Weston, Florida, Bluman earned an associate degree in business from Florida Atlantic University, attending on a full scholarship.  

In 2016 Bluman married Ariel Epstein, an amateur rider who also represents Israel in competition. The two have two sons, Avi, who was born in October 2018, and Eli, who was born in January 2020.

Riding career
Bluman started riding horses at age three. In 2004, he won the Gold Medal FEI Children World Championship at 16 years of age. In 2007 Bluman moved to Wellington, Florida, where he started his professional riding career. Bluman relocated to Belgium in 2013, where he trained with Nelson Pessoa for two years.

Representing Colombia
Bluman competed at three World Equestrian Games: the 2010 World Equestrian Games in Lexington, the 2014 World Equestrian Games in Caen, and the 2018 World Equestrian Games in Tryon. He also participated at several regional games, including the 2011 Pan American Games in Guadalajara (at which he finished 7th) and the 2015 Pan American Games. He was a 2014 team gold medalist at the Central American and Caribbean Games in Veracruz, a bronze medalist at the 2016 LGCT Grand Prix of Hamburg, and a bronze medalist at the 2016 LGCT Grand Prix of Chantilly.

Representing Colombia, Bluman competed at two Summer Olympics: the 2012 Summer Olympics in London and the 2016 Summer Olympics in Rio de Janeiro. His best Olympic result came in 2012 when he placed 20th individually in jumping as one of the youngest competing riders.

Representing Israel
Bluman has been riding on behalf of Israel since late 2016. He said "Through it all, the one thing that has always remained with me is my culture; what it means to be Jewish and to come from a family who has had to go through the Holocaust. Israel means a lot to me. Israel is a country that accepts every person — it doesn't matter your sexual orientation, your race, your religion, your ideas. It's a country that embraces you without prejudice … This is an amazing philosophy of life from an area of the world where living is not so easy. I'm very proud and emotional when I think about representing the Israeli flag."

He was named the 2018 Rider of the Year by L'Annee Hippique. In May 2019, Bluman won the Rolex Grand Prix at CSIO Rome di Siena.

In July 2019, Bluman, Ashlee Bond, Danielle G. Waldman, and Elad Yaniv won the Olympic Jumping Qualifier at Maxima Park in Moscow, qualifying for the Tokyo Olympics, the first time that Israel has earned a place in the Olympics in equestrian. However, due to a technicality regarding the registration of his horse Gemma W, Bluman was deemed ineligible to compete just weeks prior to the start of the competition.

He won the Grand Prix at the Hampton Classic Horse Show in 2017 on Ladriano Z and again in 2021 on Gemma W.

References

External links
 
 
 
 
 
 

Living people
1990 births
Colombian male equestrians
Israeli equestrians
Equestrians at the 2012 Summer Olympics
Equestrians at the 2016 Summer Olympics
Equestrians at the 2011 Pan American Games
Equestrians at the 2015 Pan American Games
Olympic equestrians of Colombia
Central American and Caribbean Games gold medalists for Colombia
Competitors at the 2014 Central American and Caribbean Games
Sportspeople from Medellín
Israeli people of Colombian-Jewish descent
Israeli people of Polish-Jewish descent
Israeli people of Dutch-Jewish descent
Israeli people of Hungarian-Jewish descent
Colombian Jews
Colombian people of Polish-Jewish descent
People of Dutch-Jewish descent
People of Hungarian-Jewish descent
Florida Atlantic University alumni
People from Wellington, Florida
Colombian people of Israeli descent
Central American and Caribbean Games medalists in equestrian
Pan American Games competitors for Colombia